Resurreccion Borra (October 20, 1935 – August 1, 2020) was a Filipino public servant who was a Career Executive Service Officer (CESO), a former commissioner and was the Acting Chairman of the Philippine Commission on Elections. He was the most senior Commissioner of COMELEC who has served the agency for over 44 years. He replaced Benjamin Abalos upon the latter's resignation.

Members of the Borra Commission
Assumed office: October 2, 2007 
Dissolved: February 2, 2008

Retirement
Chairman Borra retired effective February 2, 2008. He was replaced by Romeo A. Brawner as an Acting Chairman.

See also
Commission on Elections (Philippines)

References

1935 births
2020 deaths
Filipino civil servants
People from Manila
Commissioners of constitutional commissions of the Philippines
Arroyo administration personnel
People from Iloilo